A Hobbit is a fictional creature created by the author J. R. R. Tolkien.

Hobbit or The Hobbit may also refer to:
 The Hobbit, a 1937 novel by J. R. R. Tolkien

Arts, entertainment, and media

Films
 The Hobbit (1966 film), short Czech animation 
 The Hobbit (1977 film), animated made-for-TV film
 The Hobbit (1985 film), film shot in USSR
 The Hobbit (film series), a three-part film adaptation of the novel The Hobbit
 The Hobbit: An Unexpected Journey (2012), the first film in The Hobbit trilogy
 The Hobbit: The Desolation of Smaug (2013), the second film in The Hobbit trilogy
 The Hobbit: The Battle of the Five Armies (2014), the third film in The Hobbit trilogy

Video games
 The Hobbit (1982 video game), an adventure game
 The Hobbit (2003 video game), a platform game
 Lego The Hobbit (video game), a Lego action-adventure game

Television
 Hobitit, a Finnish Television series based on The Lord of the Rings

Other uses in arts, entertainment, and media
 Adaptations of The Hobbit
 Music of The Hobbit film series, soundtracks by Howard Shore
 "The Hobbit" (South Park), a 2013 episode of South Park

Brands and enterprises
 Hobbit, a brand of cookies manufactured by Bahlsen
 Honda PA50 or Honda Hobbit, a moped
 The Hobbit, Southampton, a pub

Computing
 Hobbit (computer), a Soviet home computer, based on the ZX Spectrum
 Hobbit (software) or Xymon
 AT&T Hobbit, an experimental microprocessor design

Science
 Hobbit (hominid) or Homo floresiensis, hominid fossils discovered in Flores, Indonesia
 Syconycteris hobbit or moss-forest blossom bat

Other uses
 Hobbit (unit), a unit of volume or weight formerly used in Wales
 Hobbit (word), a Folklore creature  (class of spirit) of North England

See also
 Halfling
 HOBET, Health Occupations Basic Entrance Test